Brigadier Lionel Bootle-Wilbraham, 6th Baron Skelmersdale,  (23 September 1896 – 21 July 1973) was a British Army officer and peer who served in both the First and Second World War.

Early life
Lionel Bootle-Wilbraham was born on 23 September 1896, the son of Major Lionel Bootle-Wilbraham, Royal Irish Fusiliers, and Lavinia, daughter of Abraham Wilson. The older Lionel was himself a grandson of Edward Bootle-Wilbraham, 1st Baron Skelmersdale. The younger Lionel was educated at Wellington College and Cheltenham College.

Military career
On the outbreak of the First World War in August 1914, Bootle-Wilbraham joined the 3rd (Special Reserve) Battalion of the Hampshire Regiment. He then entered the Royal Military College, Sandhurst, as a wartime cadet in 1915 and passed out the same year, being commissioned into the Coldstream Guards. He served with the regiment for the rest of the war, being awarded a Military Cross in 1917.

Postwar, Bootle-Wilbraham saw service in Turkey during the Chanak Crisis of 1922, and then went to India to serve as Aide-de-Camp to the Governor of Madras (1924–1927). He went to China during the Shanghai crisis of 1927, later returning to Madras as the Governor's Military Secretary (1929–1932). He also served in Egypt and Sudan in 1932.

Early in the Second World War, Bootle-Wilbraham commanded the 2nd Battalion, Coldstream Guards, in the Battle of France, which played an important part in holding the Dunkirk perimeter. He was acting commander of the 1st Guards Brigade during the final evacuation and was awarded the Distinguished Service Order.

On 20 September 1940, Bootle-Wilbraham took command of the 126th Infantry Brigade, part of the 42nd (East Lancashire) Infantry Division, a Territorial Army (TA) formation which had fought in France and been evacuated at Dunkirk. A year later the division was converted to armour, and Bootle-Wilbraham briefly transferred to command the 215th Independent Infantry Brigade (Home), and then to form and command a new 32nd Guards Brigade in October 1941. This formation was part of London District, charged with guarding some of the most vital locations in the capital; later it became the infantry component of the Guards Armoured Division.

Bootle-Wilbraham attended the Staff College, Camberley, in 1942 and was then appointed Brigadier, General Staff, in Eastern Command in 1943. In April 1945, Bootle-Wilbraham formed a new 137th Brigade headquarters to administer reception camps, selection and training battalions for wounded and temporarily unfit troops returning from overseas.

Postwar career
Bootle-Wilbraham served as a regimental lieutenant colonel of the Coldstream Guards 1946–1949, and then retired with the rank of brigadier.

After retiring from the army, Bootle-Wilbraham joined the Associated British Oil Engine Company (later Brush Export Ltd) as a director and became its representative in the Caribbean and Latin America 1949–1959.

Family
On 1 October 1936 he married Ann Quilter, daughter of Percy Cuthbert Quilter and granddaughter of Sir Cuthbert Quilter, 1st Baronet. She was born 19 May 1913 and died in 1974. They had four children:
 Hon. Lavinia, b 1 August 1937, married (1969) Robert Brian Noel Massey, and has issue.
 Hon. Olivia, b 31 December 1938, married (1961, divorced 1975) Anthony John Hoole Lowsley-Williams, and has issue
 Hon. Roger, later 7th Baron Skelmersdale (2 April 1945 – 31 October 2018)
 Hon. Daphne b 14 October 1946, married (1980, divorced 1992) Jocelyn Peter Gore Graham, and has issue

Lionel Bootle-Wilbraham succeeded as 6th Baron Skelmersdale in 1969 on the death of his cousin. He died on 21 July 1973 and was succeeded by his son Roger as 7th Baron Skelmersdale.

Notes

References
 Burke's Peerage and Baronetage, 106th Edn, London: Burke's Peerage, 1999.
 
 Hugh Sebag-Montefiore, Dunkirk: Fight to the Last Man, Penguin, 2007.
 Who was Who 1971–1980.

External links
Generals of World War II

1896 births
1973 deaths
British Army personnel of World War I
British Army brigadiers of World War II
Coldstream Guards officers
Companions of the Distinguished Service Order
Graduates of the Royal Military College, Sandhurst
People educated at Cheltenham College
People educated at Wellington College, Berkshire
Recipients of the Military Cross
Barons in the Peerage of the United Kingdom
Graduates of the Staff College, Camberley
Royal Hampshire Regiment soldiers